The Edward S. Harkness House, located at 1 East 75th Street and Fifth Avenue, is a mansion in the Upper East Side of Manhattan in New York City. It was constructed between 1907 and 1908 for Edward Harkness by James Gamble Rogers, a principal of the firm Hale & Rogers.

The New York City Landmarks Preservation Commission designated the house as a landmark in 1967. Its designation report described the building as "an imposing residence in the style of an Italian Renaissance palazzo." Today the Commonwealth Fund, founded by Harkness and his mother, has its headquarters there.


See also 
 List of New York City Designated Landmarks in Manhattan from 59th to 110th Streets

References

Further reading

External links 

History Harkness House Commonwealth Fund Website
Harkness House At Brick And Cornice

Fifth Avenue
Houses in Manhattan
New York City Designated Landmarks in Manhattan
Upper East Side